Daulia is a genus of moths of the family Crambidae.

Species
Daulia afralis Walker, 1859
Daulia argentuosalis (Swinhoe, 1890)
Daulia argyrophoralis Hampson, 1907
Daulia arizonensis Munroe, 1957
Daulia auriplumbea (Warren, 1914)
Daulia magdalena (Fernald, 1892)
Daulia subaurealis (Walker, 1866)

References

External links
 Daulia at funet

Pyraustinae
Crambidae genera
Taxa named by Francis Walker (entomologist)